The Party Party was a British radio series broadcast on BBC Radio 4 in 1987. The six-part series was a political comedy set in 1993, written by Moray Hunter, and performed by Robert Glenister, Rory Bremner, Clive Mantle, Hugh Laurie, Morwenna Banks, and Robin Driscoll. It was satirical and a bit surreal, in many cases referring to techniques used on the radio (fading footsteps, fading your voice for scene changes) and the longevity of their characters ("Are we on the next page yet?"; "Do I get extra parts?"). Set in a town called "Microcosm", characters included P, Three, Lord Knight, Penny, Dan, and Norman, of whom the later three were being taught radio techniques by Mr. Mann. They had the "Minister of Honesty", the "Minister of Flannel", and the "Department of Secrets". Bits have strong echoes of the self-referential news sketches of Monty Python.

References
 

BBC Radio comedy programmes
1987 radio programme debuts
1987 radio programme endings
Surreal comedy radio series
Satirical radio programmes